The M-2 Motorway or the Lahore–Islamabad Motorway is a north–south motorway in Pakistan, connecting Rawalpindi/Islamabad to Lahore, and is the first motorway to have been built in South Asia. The M-2 is 375 km long and located entirely in Punjab. It continues on to eventually become the M-1 motorway, which terminates in Peshawar. 
The M-2 crosses the junction of M-4 (to Faisalabad) at Pindi Bhattian and M-3 (to Multan) at Dera Saithan Wala. The motorway is also a part of the Asian Highway AH1. The motorway was constructed during Prime Minister Nawaz Sharif's rule and cost over Rs. 60 billion and was opened in November 1997. One of the most expensive motorways in Asia, it also has one of the highest pillared-bridges in Asia at the Khewra Salt Range section.

There are ten service and rest areas on both sides of the motorway, with fueling, car wash, and car-repair facilities, and fast-food restaurants such as KFC, McDonald's, and Gloria Jean's Coffees, among others.

In 2016, the entire motorway was resurfaced—work that stretched over several months. New toll plazas were installed on every interchange. They are payable with a new M-tag system that was introduced in December 2021.

History
The M-2 was conceived by Prime Minister Nawaz Sharif in his first term (1990–1993). The contract was awarded to Daewoo Group of South Korea on 30 December 1991 at a cost of Rs. 23,686 billion on a design-cum-construct basis. The original contract was for a four-lane facility.

Daewoo provided a loan of $379 million as supplier's credit, covering 40% of the construction cost. The loaned amount would eventually grow to $702 million. The other 60% of the cost would be paid by the government. 

The motorway was inaugurated on November 26, 1997, during Sharif's second term. In late 2006, upgrades were made to the portion of the M-2 passing through the Salt Range due to increasing complaints of drivers. The upgrades included better marking of the road lines and increased size of road signs for easy visibility. In 2016, the M-2 motorway was resurfaced for a smooth and safer drive.

Route

The M-2 starts to the west of Lahore, at the Thokar Niaz Baig junction of N-5 (National Highway No. 5). Once it crosses the Ravi River, it diverges from the N-5 (also known as GT or Grand Trunk Road) and heads west towards Sheikhupura. After passing the Sheikhupura Interchange, the Khanqah Dogran Interchange comes at a distance of 36 km from the Sheikhupura Interchange. Once at Pindi Bhattian, it crosses the M-4 junction and turns north-west. It continues all the way to Kallar Kahar, where it enters the Salt Ranges. Once past the Salt Range, the M-2 turns north and ends just west of Rawalpindi at the junction between the Islamabad Link Road and M-1. It then continues on to eventually become the M-1 motorway, linking the twin cities with Peshawar

The whole stretch of the M-2 consists of six lanes, and there are a number of rest areas along the route, with washroom and eating facilities.

Interchanges

Fuel stations and Service Areas
Fuel Stations are only available at 5 locations on each side of the road (North & South), These places are called Services Areas (or قیام و طعام)

 Sukheki Services Area - سکھیکی قیام و طعام
 Sial Services Area - سیال قیام و طعام
 Bhera Services Area - بھیرہ قیام و طعام 
 Kalar Kahar Services Area - کلر کہار قیام و طعام
 Chakri Services Area - چکری قیام و طعام

These services areas are on both sides of the roads, as crossing from inside the motorway is not possible. While coming from Lahore to Islamabad, the Services Areas are called North Sides (going towards north) whereas coming back towards Lahore the services areas are called South Sides (going towards South Side). For example, Sukheki North Service Area is when a traveller is coming from Lahore to Islamabad, while Sukheki South Services Area is found when going towards Lahore.
Average distance between any two service areas is 60–80 km.

Rest areas
Other than Services Areas for the facilities of commuters, the FWO has granted licences for Rest Areas with some basic services. The Rest Areas are being operated by private investors under the supervision of Frontier Works Organization (FWO). Bake & Bite is operating these Rest Areas. Moreover, the Rest Areas contain the following services/amenities on each side of the location:

 Mosque
 Fast Food Restaurants (including KFC, McDonald's, Hardee's, and Subway at some service areas)
 Bakery
 Tuck Shop
 Restrooms
 Workshops
 Petrol pumps

Gallery

See also
Motorways of Pakistan
National Highways of Pakistan
National Highway Authority (Pakistan)
National Highways and Motorway Police

References

External links 
 
 Failed state? Try Pakistan’s M-2 motorway DAWN.com
 Motorway drive from Lahore to Islamabad
 Housing Societies near Motorway M2 Lahore to Islamabad

AH1
M02
Toll roads in Pakistan